Sport Clube da Catumbela is an Angolan football club based in Catumbela in western Angola, south of Luanda.

In 1945 the team won the Girabola.

Stadium

Notable players
Joaquim Santana Silva Guimarães

Honours
Girabola: 1945, 1958

References

External links

Football clubs in Angola